A market cross, or in Scots, a mercat cross, is a structure used to mark a market square in market towns, where historically the right to hold a regular market or fair was granted by the monarch, a bishop or a baron.

History
Market crosses were originally from the distinctive tradition in Early Medieval Insular art of free-standing stone standing or high crosses, often elaborately carved, which goes back to the 7th century.  Market crosses can be found in many market towns in Britain. British emigrants often installed such crosses in their new cities, and several can be found in Canada and Australia.

The market cross could be representing the official site for a medieval town or village market, granted by a charter, or it could have once represented a traditional religious marking at a crossroads.

Design
These structures range from carved stone spires, obelisks or crosses, common to small market towns such as that in Stalbridge, Dorset, to large, ornate covered structures, such as the Chichester Cross, or Malmesbury Market Cross. They can also be constructed from wood; an example is at Wymondham, Norfolk.

Towns and villages in Great Britain with a market cross

A

 Aberdeen 
 Aberford
 Abbots Bromley 
 Aldbourne
 Alfriston
 Alnwick
 Alston
 Ambleside 
 Ashbourne
 Austwick (Base and pillar remaining)
 Askrigg
 Austwick
 Aylburton

B

 Banbury 
 Barnard Castle
 Barrow upon Humber
 Bawtry
 Bedale
 Belford 
 Beverley
 Billesdon (x2)
 Bingham
 Bingley
 Binham 
 Bishops Lydeard
 Bodenham
 Bonsall 
 Boroughbridge 
 Bottesford, Leicestershire
 Bourton, Vale of White Horse
 Bovey Tracey 
 Brandesburton
 Brigstock
 Bromborough
 Brough (Original block and socket remaining)
 Buckingham
 Bungay
 Burnley
 Bedlington
 Bury St. Edmunds
 Burton-in-Kendal
 Buxton

C

 Caldbeck
 Carlisle
 Castle Combe 
 Castle Rising
 Chapel-en-le-Frith
 Cheadle, Staffordshire
 Cheddar
 Chester 
 Chichester
 Chipping Sodbury
 Chipping Warden
 Colne
 Clowne
 Corbridge (x2)
 Corby Glen
 Corfe Castle 
 Coventry 
 Crich
 Cricklade
 Culross
 Culworth

D

 Dalton-in-Furness
 Darlington
 Devizes 
 Dunchurch
Dunkeld
 Dunstable
 Yarn Market, Dunster

E

 Edinburgh 
 Easingwold 
 East Hagbourne 
 Elstow 
 Emley, West Yorkshire
 Enfield Town
 Epworth
 Eynsham

F
 Frome

G

 Garstang
 Giggleswick
 Glasgow 
 Glastonbury 
 Glossop 
 Grampound with Creed
 Grantham
 Guisborough

H

 Harringworth 
 Helmsley
 Helpston
 Henley-in-Arden 
 Hereford 
 Higham Ferrers 
 Highburton 
 Hillmorton
 Hooton Pagnell
 Howden
 Holsworthy
 Holt
 Huddersfield
 Hunmanby

I

 Ilchester
 Irthlingborough

K

 Keighley 
 King Sterndale 
 King's Cliffe
 Kirkby in Ashfield 
 Kirkby Lonsdale (x2) 
 Kirkby Malzeard
 Kirkbymoorside
 Knaresborough

L

 Lambourn
 Launceston, Cornwall
 Lavenham
 Leek 
 Leicester
 Leigh, Greater Manchester
 Leighton–Linslade
 Leighton Buzzard 
 Lerwick
 Lower Holker
 Lund, East Riding of Yorkshire
 Lydney
 Lyneham, Wiltshire

M

 Maiden Newton 
 Maltby, South Yorkshire
 Mark, Somerset
 Market Deeping
 Malmesbury 
 Mansfield
 Mansfield Woodhouse
 Martock
 Masham 
 Maybole 
 Melbourne, Derbyshire
 Metheringham
 Middleham
 Middleton-in-Teesdale
 Mildenhall 
 Milnthorpe 
 Minchinhampton
 Minehead
 Monk Bretton
 Mountsorrel

N

 Newcastle-under-Lyme
 Newport, Wales 
 Newport, Shropshire
 Newsham, Richmondshire
 Newton Abbot
 North Frodingham
 North Kyme
 North Turton
 North Tawton
 North Walsham 
 New Buckenham 
 Northallerton
 Nunney

O

 Oakenshaw
 Oakham Market Cross 
 Old Cross, Old Glossop
 Overthorpe, West Yorkshire

P

 Pembroke
 Penryn, Cornwall
 Pontefract
 Poulton-le-Fylde

Q
 Quainton

R

 Reach, Cambridgeshire
 Repton 
 Ripley, North Yorkshire
 Ripon
 Rochdale
 Rockingham, Northamptonshire
 Rothesay
 Rutherglen

S

 Saffron Walden 
 Salisbury 
 Sedgemoor
 Selby 
 Shap 
 Shepton Mallet 
 Somerton 
 Spilsby
 St Albans
 Stalbridge
 Stamfordham
 Standish, Greater Manchester
 Stanhope, County Durham (x2)
 Steeple Ashton
 Stockton-on-Tees
 Stow-on-the-Wold
 Stretham
 Sturminster Newton
 Swaffham
 Swineshead, Lincolnshire 
 Swinton (Berwickshire)

T

 Tattershall
 Thornton-le-Dale
 Tickhill

U
 Uttoxeter

W

 Wainfleet All Saints
 Wantage
 Warkworth, Northumberland
 Wedmore
 Wells
 West Bedlington 
 West Burton
 West Malling, Kent
 Weston, Runcorn
 Whittlesey
 Wigtown (x2)
 Williton (x2) 
 Winchester 
 Witney 
 Woodhouse, South Yorkshire
 Wymondham

See also
Perron
Tottenham High Cross
Eleanor cross
Bristol High Cross - now moved
Glasgow Cross

Notes

References

Market towns
Types of monuments and memorials
Crosses by function